Béla Ferenc József Grünwald de Bártfa (2 December 1839 – 4 May 1891) was a Hungarian nationalist politician and historian who was active in Upper Hungary (today mostly Slovakia).

Life and career
Born in Szentantal to a Zipser German father, Augustin Grünwald and a noblewoman with Polish ancestry, Johanna Majovszky, Grünwald trained as a lawyer, receiving a degree from the Royal University of Pest. He attended universities in Paris, Berlin, Heidelberg, received a law degree and attended philosophy lectures. After a few months in Belgium and France, he returned to his parents' house in Besztercebánya. Serving first as administrator (alispán) of Zólyom County, in the 1878 elections he was elected a member of the Hungarian House of Representatives for Szliács (modern Sliač) in that county  as a member of the Liberal Party; he subsequently left the Liberals in 1880, serving as an independent before joining the Moderate Opposition party. 

Grünwald was an activist for the assimilationist policies of Magyarisation in the predominantly Slovak region of Upper Hungary, founding and supporting the Upper Hungary Magyar Educational Society. He viewed the construction of a centralised state as a political priority. He explained his views on the policy in his 1876 book Közigazgatásunk és a szabadság ("Our Public Administration and Freedom"), in which he urged Hungarian politicians to act as effectively and inexorably as the French in France and the English in the United Kingdom.

As a historian, Grünwald became a corresponding member of the Hungarian Academy of Sciences after the publication of his 1888 work, The Old Hungary (A régi Magyarország). In his historical works, he pursued a "democratic" method of historiography. He stated in The New Hungary (Az új Magyarország), the sequel to his 1888 book, "The genius, too, is born. He is born in a particular age, as a member of a particular nation, a class and a family, and the stamp these circles press onto his personality in his youth stays on him even if he later comes come into conflict with them." He charged the Hungarian nobility with a lack of national sentiment, and feeling greater solidarity with nobles from other nations than with the Hungarian nation; the nobles, he argued, had neglected the development of Hungary as a nation-state. Nevertheless, on 22 April 1889, he accepted ennoblement from Emperor Franz Joseph I, becoming "de Bártfa" (bártfai).

Grünwald committed suicide by gunshot wound to the head in unclear circumstances while visiting Paris on 4 May 1891. Shortly before his suicide, he sent a telegram to Albert Apponyi, the leader of the Moderate Opposition, briefly notifying him of his death: "Béla Grünwald has died after a long period of suffering". In his famous dramatic 1929 account, The Paris Story (A párizsi regény), Dezső Szomory describes Grünwald's death and burial:

Grünwald's epitaph reads, "Here lies Béla Grünwald, unbreakable apostle of the Hungarian theory of the state."

Works
Közigazgatásunk és a magyar nemzetiség [Our Administration and Hungarian Nationality] (1874). Budapest: Ráth Mór.
Közigazgatásunk és a szabadság [Our Administration and Liberty] (1876). Budapest: Ráth Mór. (Available at the Hungarian Social Science Digital Archive.)
A Felvidék [Upper Hungary] (1878). Budapest: Ráth Mór. (Available at archive.org.)
A törvényhatósági közigazgatás kézikönyve [Handbook of Municipal Administration] (4 vols., 1880–1889). Budapest: Ráth Mór (vols. 1–3), Franklin Társulat (vol. 4). (Available at archive.org.)
Kossuth és a megye. Válasz Kossuth Lajosnak [Kossuth and the County: Response to Lajos Kossuth] (1885). Budapest: Ráth Mór. (Available at oszk.hu.)
A régi Magyarország, 1711–1825 [The Old Hungary, 1711–1825] (1888). Budapest: Franklin Társulat. (Available at archive.org.)
Az új Magyarország. Gróf Széchenyi István [The New Hungary: Count István Széchenyi] (1890). Budapest: Franklin Társulat. (Available at archive.org.)

References

Bibliography

1839 births
1891 deaths
19th-century Hungarian politicians
Austro-Hungarian politicians
Burials at Montmartre Cemetery
19th-century Hungarian historians
Hungarian politicians who committed suicide
Liberal Party (Hungary) politicians
Members of the Hungarian Academy of Sciences
Suicides by firearm in France
1890s suicides